Mario Machado Meireles (born 27 April 1994) is a Swiss footballer who plays for Servette FC as a midfielder.

Football career
On 23 February 2013, Machado Meireles made his professional debut with Servette in a 2012–13 Swiss Super League match against FC Lausanne-Sport replacing Goran Karanović (90th minute).

References

External links

Servette official profile 
Football.ch profile 

1994 births
Living people
Swiss men's footballers
Association football midfielders
Swiss Super League players
Servette FC players